Aurolac is an industrial adhesive sold in Romania, designed for use in repairing terracotta stoves, which is commonly abused as an inhalant. The law HG 767/2001 applies restrictions on where and how aurolac, which it uses as a generic term for a variety of substances containing ethers, ketones, acetates, as well as methanol and toluene, can be sold.

In 2000, a child who had abused aurolac was photographed while naked and crying in a tram station in Bucharest's Rahova district. The image was widely published and used to define Romania's transition.

References 

Inhalants